This is a list of the first male and the first female climbers to reach the summit of Mount Everest by nationality.

List

See also
Timeline of Mount Everest expeditions

References

+
Everest,summiter,first,by country
Everest,summiter,first,by country
Everest,summiter,first,by country